is the first annual Kadokawa Light Novel Expo held by Kadokawa and Kimirano, which originally set on October 10 to October 11, 2020 in Tokorozawa Sakura Town , but has been postponed to March 6 - April 11, 2021 simulatenously in the website as the main venue and Tokorozawa Sakura Town as the sub venue, due to the COVID-19 pandemic. This event hosted many writers of light novel series from Kadokawa's Light Novel imprints, such as Dengeki Bunko, Fujimi Fantasia Bunko, Kadokawa Sneaker Bunko, MF Bunko J and Famitsu Bunko. It has more than 2.000 exclusive web autographed books by popular creators of more than 100 different titles of five different imprints, which sold at The Da Vinci Store. It also has the special set events, such as Sword Art Online (Dengeki Bunko), Date A Live (Fujimi Fantasia Bunko), and Re:Zero − Starting Life in Another World (MF Bunko J).

Heroines
The heroines from series that represented the main 5 Light Novel imprints are:
 Dengeki Bunko
 Light Novel: Sword Art Online
 Light Novel: The Irregular at Magic High School
 Light Novel: 86
 Famitsu Bunko
 Light Novel: In the Land of Leadale
 Light Novel: Baka and Test
 Light Novel: Wise Man's Grandchild
 Fujimi Fantasia Bunko
 Light Novel: Our Last Crusade or the Rise of a New World
 Light Novel: Slayers
 Light Novel: Date A Live
 Kadokawa Sneaker Bunko
 Light Novel: KonoSuba
 Light Novel: Record of Lodoss War
 Light Novel: Haruhi Suzumiya
 MF Bunko J
 Light Novel: Classroom of the Elite
 Light Novel: The Demon Sword Master of Excalibur Academy
 Light Novel: No Game No Life

Stages

Presentation Stages
The presentation Stages held on March 6 - March 7th 2021, with Chiaki Matsuzawa as the host of this event. The following anime announcements of the presentation plan section, which held on March 6 - March 7 2021, such as:

 
The following game announcements of the presentation section such as:

New Anime Announcements
The following new anime announcements of the New work announcement sections, such as:

Autograph Sessions
The web Autograph Sessions held on March 6 - March 7, 2021. The list of Light Novel's author and illustrator participated in autograph session are:

Note: 
 (*): Abstain for participate from this session, although the illustrators still sign their autographs along with Authors.

Best Selection 2020
Kadokawa Light Novel Expo Best Selection 2020 nomination held on January 25 2021 until February 25 2021. In the results announcement, Chiaki Matsuzawa served as the host, Yui Ogura and Rina Hidaka as the guest, and Ryu Yamazaki, The Light novel youtuber, announced the winners based on the categories.  The following series that inducted into the results include:

The Strongest Protagonist

The Supreme Heroine

Perfect Bonds of Partners

The Best Team

The Finest Comedy

Immortal Youth

Blissful Moe

Sensational Gem

Infinite Passion

Echanted Immorality

See also
 Kadokawa Light Novel Expo

References

External links
 

Anime conventions
Anime conventions in Japan